Gouraya Palli is a village in Cherial mandal in Siddipet district in the state of Telangana in India.

Population
The population of the village approximately 2000-3000.

Villages in Siddipet district